Live From Australia: The Reformation Tour 2012 (2012) is a live album by The Tea Party recorded during the Australian leg of the band's reunion tour. The album was funded and initially released September 15, 2012 through the website PledgeMusic. The album was commercially released November 23, 2012 in Australia and November 27, 2012 in the rest of the world.

The cover features the Palais Theatre in Melbourne, one of the venues where the album was recorded. Predominantly an Art Deco building, the exterior and interior include elements from Moorish architecture, which is congruous with the band's musical inspirations over their career.

Track listing

Personnel 
The Tea Party:
Jeff Burrows - drums, percussion, backing vocals
Stuart Chatwood - bass, keyboards, harmonium, mandolin, acoustic guitar, backing vocals
Jeff Martin - guitar, acoustic guitar, theremin, esraj, oud, bowed guitar, lead vocals

External links 
 Live From Australia @ PledgeMusic

The Tea Party albums
2012 live albums